Hana Jalloul Muro (born 1978) is a Spanish politician and a lecturer in international terrorism. She currently serves as member of the Assembly of Madrid in the Spanish Socialist Workers' Party (PSOE) parliamentary group. She is also the spokesperson of the group. Previously, she served as Secretary of State for Migrations from 2020 to 2021.

Biography 
Born on 8 April 1978 in Zaragoza, her mother is Aragonese and her father Lebanese. After obtaining a licentiate degree in Political and Administration Sciences, Jalloul earned a PhD in International Relations and International Law from the Complutense University of Madrid (UCM). A resident in Leganés, Jalloul has worked as associate lecturer for the Charles III University of Madrid (UC3M) in the field of International Terrorism.

A member of the Spanish Socialist Workers' Party (PSOE), she also worked as adviser for José Manuel Rodríguez Uribes at the Delegation of the Government of Spain in the Community of Madrid.

She was included in the 20th place of the PSOE list for the 2019 Madrilenian regional election. Elected as member of the 11th term of the regional legislature, she was designated as the group's spokesperson at the Committee on Justice, Interior and Victims of Terrorism.

In January 2020 she was announced as prospective Secretary of State for Migrations.

In March 2021, she was announced in media as candidate in the PSOE list for the 2021 Madrilenian regional election (number 2 second to Ángel Gabilondo), so she left her post as Secretary of State on 30 March 2021 to run for office in the regional election. Together with Lina Gálvez, she was chosen to draft the framework presentation for the 40th PSOE Federal Congress. Elected at the May 2021 election, she was pinpointed as the PSOE's spokerperson at the regional legislature following the renouncement of Ángel Gabilondo to assume his seat.

References 

Members of the 11th Assembly of Madrid
Members of the 12th Assembly of Madrid
Complutense University of Madrid alumni
Academic staff of the Charles III University of Madrid
1978 births
Living people
Experts on terrorism
Secretaries of State of Spain
Spanish people of Lebanese descent